The S&P BSE 500 Shariah Index is a stock market index established on 27 December 2010 on Bombay Stock Exchange, in collaboration with the Taqwaa Advisory and Shariah Investment Solutions (TASIS) has launched an Islamic index in a bid to attract more investors from India and overseas. On 19 February 2013, S&P Dow Jones Indices and the Bombay Stock Exchange ("BSE") announced their strategic partnership to calculate, disseminate, and license the widely followed BSE suite of indices. One of the first indices created by the partnership was the S&P BSE 500 SHARIAH. This index was designed to represent all Shariah compliant companies of the broad-based S&P BSE 500 index. The index joins the family of S&P Shariah indices with the S&P 500 Shariah, S&P Europe 350 Shariah, and S&P Pan Asia Shariah among others. The S&P BSE 500 consists of 500 of the largest, most liquid Indian stocks trading at the BSE. The index represents nearly 93% of the total market capitalization on the exchange. It covers all 20 major industries of the economy. In line with other S&P BSE indices, on 16 August 2005 the calculation methodology was changed to the free-float methodology.

References 

Bombay Stock Exchange
2010 establishments in Maharashtra
Indian stock market indices